Tod und Sieg des Herrn is an oratorio from Felix Draeseke. It is the third oratorio of his mysterium Christus.

Christus consists of four sections:Prelude – The Birth of the Lord
First Oratorio – The manifestation of the Christ
Second Oratorio – Christ the Prophet
Third Oratorio – Death and Triumph of the Lord
The third oratorio, Opus 73, is the story of the Passion of Christ.  It contains three parts – the Betrayal, the Crucifixion, and the Resurrection.  Each part is divided into three scenes:

A chorus of 150-200 members functions largely as a plot-enhancing device, replacing the role that had traditionally been filled by recitative.  Only in the form of the Chorus of Angels and the Chorus of the Faithful does the chorus play an observational role, commenting on the plot rather than becoming involved in it.  Every other role assigned to the chorus becomes a character role.  The following table illustrates the two observational roles (Angels and the Faithful) and the eight character roles represented by the chorus.  Of these, the Chorus of the Pharisees and the Chorus of the People play perhaps the largest role in the lead-up to the Crucifixion; just as the crowd influenced Pontias Pilate, so does the chorus influence both Caiphas and Pilate in this oratorio.  The choral writing resembles the turbae scenes of traditional oratorio, with one major difference:  the cries and calls of the chorus lead directly to Christ's conviction.

Compositions by Felix Draeseke
Oratorios